The S16 is a regional railway service of the S-Bahn Zürich on the Zürcher Verkehrsverbund (ZVV), Zürich transportation network, and is one of the network's services providing service within the canton of Zürich.

Route 
 
The service links Zürich Flughafen to the north of Zürich, and Herrliberg-Feldmeilen, on north shore of Lake Zürich to the east of Zürich. The service runs via Zürich Oerlikon, Zürich Hauptbahnhof and Zürich Stadelhofen, and then over the Lake Zürich right-bank railway line to its terminus. At the southern end of the service, the S16 is extended to Meilen in the evenings. The following stations are served:

 Zürich Flughafen
 Zürich Oerlikon
 Zürich Hardbrücke
 Zürich Hauptbahnhof
 Zürich Stadelhofen
 Zürich Tiefenbrunnen
 Zollikon
 Küsnacht Goldbach
 Küsnacht ZH 
 Erlenbach ZH
 Winkel am Zürichsee
 Herrliberg-Feldmeilen
 Meilen

Rolling stock 
 all services are operated with RABe 514 class trains.

Scheduling 
The normal frequency is one train every 30 minutes. A journey between Zurich Airport and Herrliberg-Feldmeilen takes 34 minutes, with an additional 7 minutes when extended to Meilen. Between Zürich Oerlikon and Herrliberg-Feldmeilen, the S16 combines with the S6 to provide a frequency of one train every 15 minutes.

History 
Prior to a change in late 2015, the S16 extended beyond Zürich Flughafen to Effretikon, with alternate trains extended to Thayngen, in the canton of Schaffhausen, running via Winterthur Hauptbahnhof and Schaffhausen. In 2015, service over this stretch of the route was transferred to the S24 service, and the S16 cut back to the airport.

See also 

 Rail transport in Switzerland
 Trams in Zürich

References

External links 
 
 ZVV official website: Routes & zones

Zürich S-Bahn lines
Canton of Schaffhausen
Transport in the canton of Zürich